Ussel is a railway station in Ussel, Nouvelle-Aquitaine, France. The station is located on the Brive-Ussel and Limoges-Ussel railway lines.  The line eastwards to Laqueuille and onwards to Clermont Ferrand was closed in 2014 due to the poor state of the track, and a lack of agreement between regional authorities as to who would fund repairs.  Onward connections are now by bus.

Train services

The station is served by regional trains towards Bordeaux, Brive-la-Gaillarde and Limoges.

Bus services

Bus services operate from Ussel to Felletin, Montluçon and Bort-les-Orgues.

Gallery

References

Railway stations in Corrèze